The 2020 British Columbia general election was held on October 24, 2020, to elect members of the Legislative Assembly to serve in the 42nd parliament of the Canadian province of British Columbia. The incumbent New Democratic Party of British Columbia (BC NDP) won a majority government, making John Horgan the first leader in the history of the BC NDP to win a second consecutive term as premier. The incoming Legislature marked the first time the NDP commanded an outright majority government in BC since the 1996 election, as well as the first province-wide popular vote win for the party since 1991.

Horgan called a snap election on September 21, 2020, the first early election in the province since the 1986 election. Horgan portrayed the call for an early election as required for stability given the fact that the BC NDP was governing with a minority of seats in the Legislative Assembly, but his decision was criticized by both the NDP's confidence and supply partner, the British Columbia Green Party, and the province's Official Opposition, the British Columbia Liberal Party, as opportunistic.

Liberal leader Andrew Wilkinson resigned two days after the election, but remained as leader until November 23.

Background
This election took place under first-past-the-post rules, as proportional representation had been rejected with 61.3% voting against it in the 2018 referendum.

Section 23 of British Columbia's Constitution Act provides that general elections occur on the third Saturday in October of the fourth calendar year after the last election. The fixed election date was previously set for the second Tuesday in May — tentatively making the next election date May 12, 2021; but the BC NDP passed legislation in 2017 amending the section of the constitution pertaining to the set election day. The same section, though, makes the fixed election date subject to the lieutenant governor's prerogative to dissolve the Legislative Assembly as he or she sees fit (in practice, on the advice of the premier or following a vote of non-confidence).

This prerogative was exercised on September 21, 2020, when Premier John Horgan called a snap election, thus dissolving the 41st Parliament. The writ of election was issued the same day, commencing a 32-day campaign. This was the first election in BC in nearly two decades to not have been held on the fixed date, following four successive elections which had adhered to fixed-date legislation under amendments to the Constitution Act introduced by the Liberal government under Gordon Campbell and passed shortly after the Liberals came into power subsequent to the 2001 election. It was also the first time a BC government had gone to the polls before the expiration of its mandate since the Social Credit government under Bill Vander Zalm called an early election in 1986.

This election was the second Canadian provincial election held during the COVID-19 pandemic, after the September 2020 election in New Brunswick – also a snap election. Due to the pandemic, more than 720,000 people requested mail-in ballots. Elections BC expected that 35 to 40 percent of ballots would be sent by mail, compared to 1 percent historically. Advance voting took place between October 15 and 21, with more than 681,000 people voting ahead of the election date.

Due to the significant increase in mail-in voting, the full results of the election were not known until November 8; the results of the judicial recount held in one constituency, West Vancouver-Sea to Sky, were only known on November 17.

The election occurred only three years and five months after the 2017 election and during the first year of the COVID-19 pandemic in Canada. By the terms of the confidence and supply agreement that had been struck between the NDP and the Green Party, the NDP had been barred from calling a snap election and from holding an election before the fixed date. The premier defended his decision to call an early election, claiming that the province needed the government to have a strong mandate and stability to deal with the challenges of the pandemic for the coming years; the governing New Democrats did not have a majority of seats in the legislature, relying on confidence and supply from the Greens for a slim combined majority. An Ipsos poll conducted for Global News and radio station CKNW found that 46 percent of people disapproved of the snap election call, while 32 percent approved. Horgan and the BC NDP had been enjoying popularity in the polls during the summer and throughout the pandemic.

Campaign 
On September 21, 2020, the BC NDP chose Nathan Cullen, a longtime party member and former member of Parliament for the federal NDP, to be the New Democratic candidate in the riding of Stikine, which is located in northwestern BC and was previously represented by Doug Donaldson. Cullen, a white man, was nominated after the NDP attempted, but failed, to find a person wanting to run who was a person from an "equity-seeking" group, such as a woman or Indigenous person; the party's policy required that a vacancy left by a male MLA not running for re-election must be filled by a person from these groups. Annita McPhee, an Indigenous woman of the Tahltan Nation who had served as president of the Tahltan Central Government, previously declared her intention to become the NDP candidate, but was not considered by the NDP. The NDP said that McPhee's application contained invalid signatures, and Cullen was nominated before the paperwork problem could be resolved. According to a party official, McPhee had indicated that she did not want to be associated with the NDP following the 2019 federal election, which was denied by McPhee.

On September 28, BC Liberal leader Andrew Wilkinson promised a one-year tax holiday on the 7% provincial sales tax, at an estimated cost of $6.9billion, and to thereafter set it to 3% for the following year, at an estimated cost of $3.9billion, saying that it would stimulate the economy.

On September 30, NDP leader John Horgan promised to improve conditions at long-term care homes, at a cost of $1.4billion.

The NDP filed a complaint to Elections BC against Liberal candidate Garry Thind, accusing him of violating the Elections Act by attempting to collect voters' information in order to provide them with a ballot.

On October 4, the BC Liberals announced that they would pause the transition in Surrey from an RCMP force to a local police department, and that they would hold a referendum of whether the city's switch to a local police department should be reversed.

On October 8, the NDP announced that they would commit to building, contingent on contributions from the federal government, the entire  SkyTrain Expo Line extension to Langley Centre by 2025.

Retiring incumbents

Liberals

New Democrats

Independent members

Political parties

Major parties

Liberal 
The British Columbia Liberal Party, a centre-right party, was led by Andrew Wilkinson. In the previous election, it won 43 seats but was reduced to 41 at dissolution. In the 41st Parliament, the BC Liberals served as the Official Opposition after briefly forming a minority government under then-premier Christy Clark, which was defeated on a confidence vote held 2 months after the 2017 British Columbia general election. The party ran candidates in all 87 ridings.

New Democratic 
The British Columbia New Democratic Party (NDP), a social democratic centre-left party, was led by John Horgan. It had 41 seats in the outgoing Legislative Assembly and governed BC with a minority government. The party entered a confidence and supply agreement with the Greens following the previous election, allowing the NDP to form government despite being the party with the second-largest share of seats. It ran candidates in all 87 ridings.

Green 
The Green Party of British Columbia, a green centre-left, was led by Sonia Furstenau. It won 3 seats in the previous election but had been reduced to 2 seats by the time the 2020 election was called. The Green Party supported the minority NDP government by providing confidence and supply. It ran candidates in 74 out of the 87 ridings.

Minor parties

Christian Heritage 
The Christian Heritage Party of British Columbia (CHP) was led by Laura-Lynn Tyler Thompson. It ran candidates in 5 ridings.

Communist 
The Communist Party of British Columbia (Comm.) was led by Timothy Gidora. It ran candidates in 5 ridings.

Conservative 
The Conservative Party of British Columbia (Con.) was led by Trevor Bolin. It ran candidates in 19 ridings.

Libertarian 
The British Columbia Libertarian Party (Ltn.) was led by Donald Wilson. It ran candidates in 25 ridings.

Rural 
The Rural BC Party was led by Jonathan Van Barneveld. It ran a candidate in 1 riding.

Vision 
The BC Vision party was led by Jagmohan Bhandari. It ran candidates in 3 ridings.

Wexit 
Wexit BC became a registered party with Elections BC in 2020 and was led by Lee Smith. It ran candidates in 2 ridings.

Independents 
Along with the parties above, 24 individuals ran as independent candidates across 22 ridings.

Debates

Results 
These are the final results, which include mail-in and absentee ballots.

|-
!rowspan="2" colspan="2"|Party
!rowspan="2"|Leader
!rowspan="2"|Candidates
!colspan="5"|Seats
!colspan="3"|Votes
|-
!2017
!Dissolution
!Elected
!%
!Change
!#
!%
!Change (pp)
|-
 
|style="text-align: left;"| John Horgan || 87 || 41 || 41 || 57 || 65.52 || +16 || 898,384 || 47.69 || +7.32   
 
|style="text-align: left;"| Andrew Wilkinson || 87 || 43 || 41 || 28 || 32.18 || −15 || 636,148 || 33.77 || −6.52   
 
|style="text-align: left;"| Sonia Furstenau || 74 || 3 || 2 || 2 || 2.30 || −1 || 284,151 || 15.09 || −1.74   
 
|style="text-align: left;"| Trevor Bolin || 19 || 0 || 0 || 0 || 0 || 0 || 35,902 || 1.91 || +1.38   

|style="text-align: left;" colspan="2"|Independent || 24 || 0 || 2 || 0 || 0 || 0 || 13,818 || 0.33 || −0.20  
 
|style="text-align: left;"| Donald Wilson || 25 || 0 || 0 || 0 || 0 || 0 || 8,360 || 0.44 || +0.05  
 
|style="text-align: left;"| Laura-Lynn Tyler Thompson || 5 || 0 || 0 || 0 || 0 || 0 || 3,895 || 0.21 || +0.04   
 
|style="text-align: left;"| Timothy Gidora || 5 || 0 || 0 || 0 || 0 || 0 || 786 || 0.04 || 0.00    
 
|style="text-align: left;"| Jagmohan Bhandari || 3 || 0 || 0 || 0 || 0 || 0 || 761 || 0.04 ||  
 
|style="text-align: left;"| Jonathan Van Barneveld || 1 || 0 || 0 || 0 || 0 || 0 || 754 || 0.04 ||  
 
|style="text-align: left;"| Lee Smith || 2 || 0 || 0 || 0 || 0 || 0 || 673 || 0.04 ||  

| colspan="3" style="text-align:left;"|Vacant
|0 ||1 || colspan="6" 
|-
|style="text-align: left;" colspan="9"|Total valid votes || 1,883,632 || 100.00 || –
|-
!colspan="12"|
|-
|style="text-align: left;" colspan="9"|Blank and invalid votes || 14,921 || 0.79 || +0.20
|-
|style="text-align: left;" colspan="3"|Total || 332 || 87 || 87 || 87 || 100.00 || 0 || 1,898,553 || 100.00 || 0 
|-
|style="text-align: left;" colspan="9"|Registered voters / turnout || 3,524,812 || 53.86 || −7.34
|-
|style="text-align: left;" colspan="12"|Source: Elections BC
|}

Synopsis of results

 = open seat

Detailed analysis

Significant results among independent and minor party candidates
Those candidates not belonging to a major party, receiving more than 1,000 votes in the election, are listed below:

Results by riding 
The following tables present results by riding per Elections BC.
 Names in bold are outgoing cabinet ministers, and names in italics are party leaders. The premier is in both.
  denotes incumbent MLAs who are not seeking re-election.
  denotes incumbent MLAs who are seeking re-election in a different riding.
 A riding name in brackets below the name of the incumbent MLA indicates the name of the predecessor riding contested in the last election.
 Candidate names are given as they appeared on the ballot, and may include formal names and middle names that the candidate does not use in day-to-day political life. For example, Greg Kyllo appeared on the ballot as Gregory James Kyllo.

Northern British Columbia

|-
| style="background:whitesmoke;"|Nechako Lakes
|| ||John Rustad4,611 – 52.24%
| ||Anne Marie Sam3,031 – 34.34%
| ||
| ||Jon Rempel403 – 4.57%
| || 
|| ||John Rustad
|-
| style="background:whitesmoke;"|North Coast
| ||Roy Jones Jr.1,429 – 22.90%
|| ||Jennifer Rice4,544 – 72.82%
| ||
| ||Jody Craven267 – 4.28%
| ||
|| || Jennifer Rice
|-
| style="background:whitesmoke;"|Peace River North
|| ||Dan Davies6,746 – 55.76%
| ||Danielle Monroe1,202 – 9.94%
| ||
| ||
| ||Trevor Bolin (Cons.)4,150 – 34.30%
|| ||Dan Davies
|-
| style="background:whitesmoke;"|Peace River South
|| ||Mike Bernier3,862 – 51.19%
| ||Cory Grizz Longley1,180 – 15.64%
| ||
| ||
| || 
|| ||Mike Bernier
|-
| style="background:whitesmoke;"|Prince George-Mackenzie
|| ||Mike Morris8,543 – 50.80%
| ||Joan Atkinson5,717 – 33.99%
| ||Catharine Kendall1,935 – 11.51%
| ||Raymond Rodgers287 – 1.71%
| ||Dee Kranz (CHP)336 – 2.00%
|| ||Mike Morris
|-
| style="background:whitesmoke;"|Prince George-Valemount
|| ||Shirley Bond9,703 – 55.62%
| ||Laura Parent4,717 – 27.04%
| ||Mackenzie Kerr2,597 – 14.89%
| ||Sean Robson428 – 2.45%
| ||
|| ||Shirley Bond
|-
| style="background:whitesmoke;"|Skeena
|| ||Ellis Ross5,810 – 52.06%
| ||Nicole Halbauer4,961 – 44.45%
| ||
| ||
| ||Martin Holzbauer (ind.)389 – 3.49%
|| ||Ellis Ross
|-
| style="background:whitesmoke;"|Stikine
| ||Gordon Sebastian1,904 – 26.32%
|| ||Nathan Cullen3,745 – 51.77%
| ||
| ||
| || 
|| ||Doug Donaldson
|-

Kootenays

|-
| style="background:whitesmoke;"|Columbia River-Revelstoke
|| ||Doug Clovechok7,034 – 48.03%
| ||Nicole Cherlet5,708 – 38.97%
| ||Samson Boyer1,904 – 13.00%
| ||
|| ||Doug Clovechok
|-
| style="background:whitesmoke;"|Kootenay East
|| ||Tom Shypitka9,897 – 57.90%
| ||Wayne Stetski5,499 – 32.17%
| ||Kerri Wall1,697 – 9.93%
| ||
|| ||Tom Shypitka
|-
| style="background:whitesmoke;"|Kootenay West
| ||Corbin Kelley1,975 – 11.16%
|| ||Katrine Conroy10,822 – 61.15%
| ||Andrew Duncan3,040 – 17.18%
| || 
|| ||Katrine Conroy
|-
| style="background:whitesmoke;"|Nelson-Creston
| ||Tanya Finley4,171 – 23.89%
|| ||Brittny Anderson7,296 – 41.78%
| ||Nicole Charlwood5,611 – 32.13%
| ||Terry Tiessen (Ltn.)384 – 2.20%
|| ||Michelle Mungall
|-

Okanagan, Shuswap and Boundary

|-
| style="background:whitesmoke;"|Boundary-Similkameen
| ||Petra Veintimilla7,735 – 36.72%
|| ||Roly Russell10,500 – 49.85%
| ||
| ||Darryl Seres (Cons.)2,354 – 11.18%Arlyn Greig (Wexit)474 – 2.25%
|| ||Linda Larson
|-
| style="background:whitesmoke;"|Kelowna-Lake Country
|| ||Norm Letnick14,679 – 55.73%
| ||Justin Kulik7,121 – 27.04%
| ||John Janmaat3,833 – 14.55%
| || 
|| ||Norm Letnick
|-
| style="background:whitesmoke;"|Kelowna-Mission
|| ||Renee Merrifield13,483 – 50.76%
| ||Krystal Smith8,605 – 32.39%
| ||Amanda Poon4,476 – 16.85%
| ||
|| ||Steve Thomson
|-
| style="background:whitesmoke;"|Kelowna West
|| ||Ben Stewart12,991 – 49.89%
| ||Spring Hawes8,854 – 34.00%
| ||Peter Truch3,274 – 12.57%
| || 
|| || Ben Stewart
|-
| style="background:whitesmoke;"|Penticton
|| ||Dan Ashton13,217 – 48.19%
| ||Toni Boot10,343 – 37.71%
| ||Ted Shumaker3,152 – 11.49%
| ||Keith MacIntyre (Ltn.)717 – 2.61%

|| ||Dan Ashton
|-
| style="background:whitesmoke;"|Shuswap
|| ||Greg Kyllo13,300 – 51.35%
| ||Sylvia Lindgren8,816 – 34.04%
| ||Owen Madden3,784 – 14.61%
| ||
|| ||Greg Kyllo
|-
| style="background:whitesmoke;"|Vernon-Monashee
| ||Eric Foster9,798 – 35.05%
|| ||Harwinder Sandhu10,222 – 36.56%
| ||Keli Westgate4,464 – 15.97%
| ||Kyle Delfing (Cons.)3,472 – 12.42%
|| ||Eric Foster
|-

Thompson and Cariboo

|-
| style="background:whitesmoke;"|Cariboo-Chilcotin
|| ||Lorne Doerkson6,600 – 51.25%
| ||Scott Andrews4,180 – 32.46%
| ||David Laing1,379 – 10.71%
| || 
|| ||Donna Barnett
|-
| style="background:whitesmoke;"|Cariboo North
|| ||Coralee Oakes5,367 – 48.42%
| ||Scott Elliott3,809 – 34.36%
| ||Douglas Gook707 – 6.38%
| ||Kyle Townsend (Cons.)1,201 – 10.84%
|| ||Coralee Oakes
|-
| style="background:whitesmoke;"|Fraser-Nicola
|| ||Jackie Tegart5,696 – 41.64%
| ||Aaron Sumexheltza5,414 – 39.58%
| ||Jonah Timms1,788 – 13.07%
| || 
|| ||Jackie Tegart
|-
| style="background:whitesmoke;"|Kamloops-North Thompson
|| ||Peter Milobar9,341 – 40.99%
| ||Sadie Hunter9,145 – 40.13%
| ||Thomas Martin2,224 – 9.76%
| || 
|| ||Peter Milobar
|-
| style="background:whitesmoke;"|Kamloops-South Thompson
|| ||Todd Stone13,453 – 51.14%
| ||Anna Thomas8,575 – 32.60%
| ||Dan Hines4,276 – 16.26%
| ||
|| ||Todd Stone
|-

Fraser Valley

|-
| style="background:whitesmoke;"|Abbotsford-Mission
| ||Simon Gibson9,620 – 38.12%
| | ||Pam Alexis10,364 – 41.07%
| ||Stephen Fowler2,667 – 10.57%
| ||Trevor Hamilton1,989 – 7.88%
| || Aeriol Alderking (CHP)595 – 2.36%
|| ||Simon Gibson
|-
| style="background:whitesmoke;"|Abbotsford South
|| || Bruce Banman9,730 – 44.69%
| ||Inder Johal7,706 – 35.39%
| || Aird Flavelle2,617 – 12.02%
| ||
| ||Laura-Lynn Thompson (CHP)1,720 – 7.90%
|| ||Darryl Plecas
|-
| style="background:whitesmoke;"|Abbotsford West
|| ||Mike de Jong8,880 – 45.51%
| ||Preet Rai7,119 – 36.49%
| ||Kevin Eastwood1,671 – 8.56%
| ||Michael Henshall1,766 – 9.05%
| ||Sukhi Gill (Vision)75 – 0.38%
|| ||Mike de Jong
|-
| style="background:whitesmoke;"|Chilliwack
| ||John Martin5,102 – 28.85%
|| ||Dan Coulter7,349 – 41.56%
| ||Tim Cooper1,888 – 10.68%
| ||Diane Janzen2,910 – 16.46%
| || 
|| ||John Martin
|-
| style="background:whitesmoke;"|Chilliwack-Kent
| ||Laurie Throness6,964 – 30.68%
|| ||Kelli Paddon8,268 – 36.42%
| ||Jeff Hammersmark1,822 – 8.03%
| ||
| || 
|| ||Laurie Throness
|-
| style="background:whitesmoke;"|Langley
| ||Mary Polak8,014 – 34.09%
|| ||Andrew Mercier11,089 – 47.17%
| ||Bill Masse2,469 – 10.50%
| ||Shelly Jan1,936 – 8.24%
| ||
|| ||Mary Polak
|-
| style="background:whitesmoke;"|Langley East
| ||Margaret Kunst10,385 – 33.56%
|| ||Megan Dykeman13,169 – 42.56%
| ||Cheryl Wiens3,533 – 11.42%
| ||Ryan Warawa3,428 – 11.08%
| || 
|| ||Rich Coleman
|-
| style="background:whitesmoke;"|Maple Ridge-Mission
| ||Chelsa Meadus9,009 – 33.75%
|| || Bob D'Eith14,721 – 55.15%
| ||Matt Trenholm2,962 – 11.10%
| ||
| ||
|| ||Bob D'Eith
|-
| style="background:whitesmoke;"|Maple Ridge-Pitt Meadows
| || Cheryl Ashlie9,163 – 36.59%
|| ||Lisa Beare15,877 – 63.41%
| ||
| ||
| ||
|| ||Lisa Beare
|-

Surrey 

|-
| style="background:whitesmoke;"|Surrey-Cloverdale
| ||Marvin Hunt8,758 – 35.12%
|| ||Mike Starchuk12,992 – 52.10%
| ||Rebecca Smith2,169 – 8.70%
| || 
|| ||Marvin Hunt
|-
| style="background:whitesmoke;"|Surrey-Fleetwood
| || Garry Thind5,776 – 30.72%
|| || Jagrup Brar11,457 – 60.93%
| ||Dean McGee1,571 – 8.35%
| ||
|| ||Jagrup Brar
|-
| style="background:whitesmoke;"|Surrey-Green Timbers
| ||Dilraj Atwal5,540 – 40.41%
|| ||Rachna Singh8,171 – 59.59%
| ||
| ||
|| ||Rachna Singh
|-
| style="background:whitesmoke;"|Surrey-Guildford
| || Dave Hans5,139 – 29.93%
|| || Garry Begg10,403 – 60.59%
| ||Jodi Murphy1,345 – 7.83%
| ||Sam Kofalt (ind.)282 – 1.64%
|| ||Garry Begg
|-
| style="background:whitesmoke;"|Surrey-Newton
| || Paul Boparai3,911 – 27.55%
|| ||Harry Bains8,893 – 62.64%
| ||Asad Syed1,393 – 9.81%
| ||
|| ||Harry Bains
|-
| style="background:whitesmoke;"|Surrey-Panorama
| || Gulzar Cheema9,607 – 42.89%
|| || Jinny Sims12,336 – 55.07%
| ||
| ||Sophie Shrestha (Vision)458 – 2.04%
|| ||Jinny Sims
|-
| style="background:whitesmoke;"|Surrey South
|| ||Stephanie Cadieux12,970 – 47.36%
| ||Pauline Greaves11,794 – 43.06%
| ||Tim Ibbotson2,623 – 9.58%
| ||
|| ||Stephanie Cadieux
|-
| style="background:whitesmoke;"|Surrey-Whalley
| ||Shaukat Khan4,052 – 26.15%
|| ||Bruce Ralston10,994 – 70.94%
| ||
| || 
|| ||Bruce Ralston
|-
| style="background:whitesmoke;"|Surrey-White Rock
|| ||Trevor Halford10,718 – 39.51%
| ||Bryn Smith10,494 – 38.69%
| ||Beverly Hobby3,862 – 14.24%
| || 
| | ||Vacant
|-

Richmond and Delta

|-
| style="background:whitesmoke;"|Delta North
| ||Jet Sunner7,179 – 33.37%
|| ||Ravi Kahlon12,215 – 56.78%
| ||Neema Manral2,120 – 9.85%
| ||
|| ||Ravi Kahlon
|-
| style="background:whitesmoke;"|Delta South
|| ||Ian Paton12,828 – 51.70%
| ||Bruce Reid8,404 – 33.87%
| ||Peter van der Velden3,581 – 14.43%
| ||
|| ||Ian Paton
|-
| style="background:whitesmoke;"|Richmond North Centre
|| ||Teresa Wat7,675 – 51.26%
| ||Jaeden Dela Torre5,964 – 39.83%
| ||Vernon Wang1,333 – 8.90%
| ||
|| ||Teresa Wat
|-
| style="background:whitesmoke;"|Richmond-Queensborough
| ||Jas Johal7,728 – 39.15%
|| ||Aman Singh9,406 – 47.65%
| ||Earl Einarson1,496 – 7.58%
| ||Kay Hale (Cons.)1,108 – 5.61%
|| ||Jas Johal
|-
| style="background:whitesmoke;"|Richmond South Centre
| ||Alexa Loo6,564 – 49.33%
|| ||Henry Yao6,743 – 50.67%
| ||
| ||
|| ||Linda Reid
|-
| style="background:whitesmoke;"|Richmond-Steveston
| ||Matt Pitcairn9,398 – 45.59%
|| ||Kelly Greene10,733 – 52.07%
| ||
| ||Vince Li (ind.)483 – 2.34%
|| ||John Yap
|-

Burnaby, New Westminster, and the Tri-Cities

|-
| style="background:whitesmoke;"|Burnaby-Deer Lake
| ||Glynnis Hoi Sum Chan5,163 – 31.81%
|| ||Anne Kang9,190 – 56.62%
| ||Mehreen Chaudry1,878 – 11.57%
| ||
|| ||Anne Kang
|-
| style="background:whitesmoke;"|Burnaby-Edmonds
| ||Tripat Atwal4,754 – 26.65%
|| ||Raj Chouhan11,063 – 62.01%
| ||Iqbal Parekh2,023 – 11.34%
| ||
|| ||Raj Chouhan
|-
| style="background:whitesmoke;"|Burnaby-Lougheed
| ||Tariq Malik5,386 – 25.81%
|| ||Katrina Chen12,574 – 60.25%
| ||Andrew Williamson2,628 – 12.59%
| ||Dominique Paynter (Ltn.)281 – 1.35%
|| ||Katrina Chen
|-
| style="background:whitesmoke;"|Burnaby North
| ||Raymond Dong6,846 – 30.69%
|| ||Janet Routledge12,894 – 57.80%
| ||Norine Shim2,568 – 11.51%
| ||
|| ||Janet Routledge
|-
| style="background:whitesmoke;"|Coquitlam-Burke Mountain
| ||Joan Isaacs8,324 – 36.22%
|| ||Fin Donnelly12,627 – 54.94%
| ||Adam Bremner-Akins2,033 – 8.85%
| ||
|| ||Joan Isaacs
|-
| style="background:whitesmoke;"|Coquitlam-Maillardville
| ||Will Davis5,882 – 28.60%
|| ||Selina Robinson12,278 – 59.70%
| ||Nicola Spurling2,405 – 11.69%
| ||
|| ||Selina Robinson
|-
| style="background:whitesmoke;"|New Westminster
| ||Lorraine Brett4,291 – 16.26%
|| ||Jennifer Whiteside15,903 – 60.25%
| ||Cyrus Sy5,020 – 19.02%
| || 
|| ||Judy Darcy
|-
| style="background:whitesmoke;"|Port Coquitlam
| ||Mehran Zargham5,009 – 20.90%
|| ||Mike Farnworth15,370 – 64.14%
| ||Erik Minty3,023 – 12.61%
| ||Lewis Clarke Dahlby (Ltn.)563 – 2.35%
|| ||Mike Farnworth
|-
| style="background:whitesmoke;"|Port Moody-Coquitlam
| ||James Robertson7,253 – 30.50%
|| ||Rick Glumac12,783 – 53.75%
| ||John Latimer2,802 – 11.78%
| || 
|| ||Rick Glumac
|-

Vancouver

|-
| style="background:whitesmoke;"|Vancouver-Fairview
| ||George Affleck7,570 – 27.32%
|| ||George Heyman15,538 – 56.07%
| ||Ian Goldman4,368 – 15.76%
| ||Sandra Filosof-Schipper234 – 0.84%
| ||
|| ||George Heyman
|-
| style="background:whitesmoke;"|Vancouver-False Creek
| ||Sam Sullivan9,217 – 37.54%
|| ||Brenda Bailey11,484 – 46.77%
| ||Maayan Kreitzman3,108 – 12.66%
| ||Naomi Chocyk280 – 1.14%
| ||Erik Gretland (Cons.)465 – 1.89%
|| ||Sam Sullivan
|-
| style="background:whitesmoke;"|Vancouver-Fraserview
| ||David Grewal7,511 – 34.57%
|| ||George Chow12,247 – 56.37%
| ||Francoise Raunet1,969 – 9.06%
| ||
| ||
|| ||George Chow
|-
| style="background:whitesmoke;"|Vancouver-Hastings
| ||Alex Read3,885 – 17.61%
|| ||Niki Sharma13,362 – 60.56% 
| ||Bridget Burns4,312 – 19.54%
| ||Golok Z. Buday321 – 1.45%
| ||Kimball Cariou (Comm.)184 – 0.83%
|| ||Shane Simpson
|-
| style="background:whitesmoke;"|Vancouver-Kensington
| ||Paul Lepage5,255 – 25.25%
|| ||Mable Elmore12,481 – 59.97%
| ||Nazanin Moghadami2,874 – 13.81%
| ||
| ||Salvatore Vetro (ind.)202 – 0.97%
|| ||Mable Elmore
|-
| style="background:whitesmoke;"|Vancouver-Kingsway
| ||Cole Anderson3,919 – 21.61%
|| ||Adrian Dix12,297 – 67.81%
| ||Scott Bernstein1,662 – 9.16%
| ||Karin Litzcke257 – 1.42%
| || 
|| ||Adrian Dix
|-
| style="background:whitesmoke;"|Vancouver-Langara
|| ||Michael Lee9,888 – 48.51%
| ||Tesicca Chi-Ying Truong8,431 – 41.26%
| ||Stephanie Hendy1,840 – 9.03%
| ||Paul Matthews224 – 1.10%
| || 
|| ||Michael Lee
|-
| style="background:whitesmoke;"|Vancouver-Mount Pleasant
| ||George Vassilas2,816 – 12.98%
|| ||Melanie Mark14,530 – 66.95%
| ||Kelly Tatham4,356 – 20.07%
| ||
| ||
|| ||Melanie Mark
|-
| style="background:whitesmoke;"|Vancouver-Point Grey
| ||Mark Bowen7,712 – 31.41%
|| ||David Eby12,602 – 51.32%
| ||Devyani Singh4,241 – 17.27%
| ||
| || 
|| ||David Eby
|-
| style="background:whitesmoke;"|Vancouver-Quilchena
|| ||Andrew Wilkinson12,157 – 56.04%
| ||Heather McQuillan6,197 – 28.56%
| ||Michael Barkusky3,341 – 15.40%
| ||
| || 
|| ||Andrew Wilkinson
|-
| style="background:whitesmoke;"|Vancouver-West End
| ||Jon Ellacott4,014 – 20.11%
|| ||Spencer Chandra Herbert12,439 – 62.31%
| ||James Marshall3,250 – 16.28%
| ||Kim McCann259 – 1.30%
| ||
|| ||Spencer Chandra Herbert
|-

North Shore

|-
| style="background:whitesmoke;"|North Vancouver-Lonsdale
| ||Lyn Anglin7,274 – 27.43%
|| ||Bowinn Ma15,878 – 59.87%
| ||Christopher Hakes3,369 – 12.70%
| ||
|| ||Bowinn Ma
|-
| style="background:whitesmoke;"|North Vancouver-Seymour
| ||Jane Thornthwaite9,827 – 35.70%
|| ||Susie Chant12,891 – 46.84%
| ||Harrison Johnson4,514 – 16.40%
| ||Clayton Welwood (Ltn.)291 – 1.06%
|| ||Jane Thornthwaite
|-
| style="background:whitesmoke;"|West Vancouver-Capilano
|| ||Karin Kirkpatrick12,734 – 53.55%
| ||Amelia Hill7,194 – 30.25%
| ||Rasoul Narimani3,664 – 15.41%
| ||Anton Shendryk (ind.)186 – 0.78%
|| ||Ralph Sultan
|-
| style="background:whitesmoke;"|West Vancouver-Sea to Sky
|| ||Jordan Sturdy9,249 – 37.54%
| ||Keith Murdoch6,194 – 25.16%
|  ||Jeremy Valeriote9,189 – 37.30%
| ||
|| ||Jordan Sturdy
|-

Vancouver Island and Sunshine Coast

|-
| style="background:whitesmoke;"|Courtenay-Comox
| ||Brennan Day8,655 – 29.85%
|| ||Ronna-Rae Leonard14,663 – 50.56%
| ||Gillian Anderson5,681 – 19.59%
| ||
|| ||Ronna-Rae Leonard
|-
| style="background:whitesmoke;"|Cowichan Valley
| ||Tanya Kaul4,606 – 15.59%
| ||Rob Douglas11,875 – 40.20%
|| ||Sonia Furstenau13,059 – 44.21%
| ||
|| ||Sonia Furstenau
|-
| style="background:whitesmoke;"|Mid Island-Pacific Rim
| ||Helen Poon4,291 – 17.47%
|| ||Josie Osborne14,298 – 58.22%
| ||Evan Jolicoeur4,991 – 20.32%
| || 
|| ||Scott Fraser
|-
| style="background:whitesmoke;"|Nanaimo
| ||Kathleen Jones5,903 – 22.42%
|| ||Sheila Malcolmson14,344 – 54.49%
| ||Lia Marie Constance Versaevel6,078 – 23.09%
| ||
|| ||Sheila Malcolmson
|-
| style="background:whitesmoke;"|Nanaimo-North Cowichan
| ||Duck Paterson5,354 – 20.72%
|| ||Doug Routley12,787 – 49.48%
| ||Chris Istace7,700 – 29.80%
| ||
|| ||Doug Routley
|-
| style="background:whitesmoke;"|North Island
| ||Norm Facey5,904 – 24.04%
|| ||Michele Babchuk12,467 – 50.75%
| ||Alexandra Morton4,731 – 19.26%
| ||John Twigg (Cons.)1,462 – 5.95%
|| ||Claire Trevena
|-
| style="background:whitesmoke;"|Parksville-Qualicum
| ||Michelle Stilwell11,155 – 35.47%
|| ||Adam Walker13,207 – 42.00%
| ||Rob Lyon5,227 – 16.62%
| || 
|| ||Michelle Stilwell
|-
| style="background:whitesmoke;"|Powell River-Sunshine Coast
| ||Sandra Stoddart-Hansen4,156 – 16.65%
|| ||Nicholas Simons12,701 – 50.88%
| ||Kim Darwin8,104 – 32.47%
| ||
|| ||Nicholas Simons
|-

Greater Victoria

|-
| style="background:whitesmoke;"|Esquimalt-Metchosin
| ||RJ Senko3,940 – 15.51%
|| ||Mitzi Dean15,070 – 59.32%
| ||Andy Mackinnon6,140 – 24.17%
| ||Desta McPherson (ind.)254 – 1.00%
|| ||Mitzi Dean
|-
| style="background:whitesmoke;"|Langford-Juan de Fuca
| ||Kelly Darwin3,980 – 14.95%
|| ||John Horgan18,073 – 67.89%
| ||Gord Baird4,437 – 16.67%
| ||Tyson Riel Strandlund (Comm.)130 – 0.49%
|| ||John Horgan
|-
| style="background:whitesmoke;"|Oak Bay-Gordon Head
| ||Roxanne Helme6,597 – 22.87%
|| ||Murray Rankin14,748 – 51.12%
| ||Nicole Duncan7,362 – 25.52%
| ||Florian Castle (Comm.)142 – 0.49%
|| ||Andrew Weaver
|-
| style="background:whitesmoke;"|Saanich North and the Islands
| ||Stephen P. Roberts6,547 – 19.01%
| ||Zeb King9,990 – 29.01%
|| ||Adam Olsen17,897 – 51.97%
| ||
|| ||Adam Olsen
|-
| style="background:whitesmoke;"|Saanich South
| ||Rishi Sharma6,608 – 24.22%
|| ||Lana Popham15,190 – 55.67%
| ||Kate O'Connor5,488 – 20.11%
| ||
|| ||Lana Popham
|-
| style="background:whitesmoke;"|Victoria-Beacon Hill
| ||Karen Bill4,329 – 14.35%
|| ||Grace Lore16,474 – 54.61%
| ||Jenn Neilson9,031 – 29.93%
| ||Jordan Reichert (ind.)335 – 1.11%
|| ||Carole James
|-
| style="background:whitesmoke;"|Victoria-Swan Lake
| ||David Somerville2,743 – 11.35%
|| ||Rob Fleming14,384 – 59.49%
| ||Annemieke Holthuis6,700 – 27.71%
| || 
|| ||Rob Fleming
|-

Seats changing hands 
11 incumbent MLAs lost their seats.

Open seats changing hands

Student Vote results 
Student votes are mock elections that run parallel to actual elections, in which students not of voting age participate. They are administered by Student Vote Canada. Student vote elections are for educational purposes and do not count towards the results. There were ties in two constituencies, Kelowna—Lake Country (BC Green and BC NDP) and Shuswap (BC Liberal and BC NDP), which were both counted twice.

! colspan="2" rowspan="2"|Party
! rowspan="2"|Leader
! colspan="2"|Seats
! colspan="2"|Votes
|-
! Elected
! %
! #
! %
|-

|style="text-align: left;"| John Horgan
|58 || 65.17 || 33,655 || 39.86
|-

|style="text-align: left;"| Sonia Furstenau
|17 || 19.10 || 23,371 || 27.68
|-

|style="text-align: left;"| Andrew Wilkinson 
|12 || 13.48 || 21,545 || 25.52
|-

|style="text-align: left;"| Trevor Bolin
|1 || 1.12 || 2,066 || 2.45
|-
 
|style="text-align: left;"| Laura-Lynn Tyler Thompson
|1 || 1.12 || 336 || 0.40
|-
|style="background-color:gainsboro"|
|colspan="2" style="text-align: left;"|Others
|0 || 0 || 3,463 || 4.09
|-
|colspan="3" style="text-align: left;"|Total
|87+2 || 100.0 || 84,436 || 100.0
|-
|colspan="7" style="text-align: left;"| Source: Student Vote Canada
|}

Opinion polls

Voter intention polling

Preferred premier polling

Notes and references

Notes

References

Further reading

External links 
 Elections BC
 Legislative Assembly Library Election Weblinks

2020 elections in Canada
2020
British Columbia general election
Election